27th BSFC Awards
December 11, 2006

Best Film: 
 The Departed 
The 27th Boston Society of Film Critics Awards, honoring the best in filmmaking in 2006, were given on 11 December 2006.

Winners

Best Film:
The Departed
Runner-up: United 93
Best Actor:
Forest Whitaker – The Last King of Scotland
Runner-up: Ryan Gosling – Half Nelson
Best Actress:
Helen Mirren – The Queen
Runner-up: Judi Dench – Notes on a Scandal
Best Supporting Actor:
Mark Wahlberg – The Departed
Runner-up (TIE): Alec Baldwin – The Departed, Running with Scissors and The Good Shepherd and Michael Sheen – The Queen
Best Supporting Actress:
Shareeka Epps – Half Nelson
Runner-up (TIE): Jennifer Hudson – Dreamgirls and Meryl Streep – The Devil Wears Prada
Best Director:
Martin Scorsese – The Departed
Runner-up: Paul Greengrass – United 93
Best Screenplay:
William Monahan – The Departed
Runner-up: Peter Morgan – The Queen
Best Cinematography:
Guillermo Navarro – Pan's Labyrinth (El laberinto del fauno)
Runner-up (TIE): Stuart Dryburgh – The Painted Veil and Zhao Xiaoding – Curse of the Golden Flower (Man cheng jin dai huang jin jia)
Best Documentary (TIE):
Deliver Us from Evil
Shut Up & Sing
Runner-up: 51 Birch Street
Best Foreign-Language Film:
Pan's Labyrinth (El laberinto del fauno) • Mexico/Spain/United States
Runner-up: Volver • Spain
Best New Filmmaker:
Ryan Fleck – Half Nelson
Runner-up: Jonathan Dayton and Valerie Faris – Little Miss Sunshine
Best Ensemble Cast:
United 93
Runner-up: The Departed

External links
 Past Winners

References
 'The Departed' tops Boston film critics' awards Boston Globe
 Boston Society of Film Critics Hollywood Elsewhere

2006
2006 film awards
2006 awards in the United States
2006 in Boston
December 2006 events in the United States